Kevin Bond (26 May 1928 – 8 October 1991) was an  Australian rules footballer who played with Hawthorn in the Victorian Football League (VFL). 

Bond played 74 senior games with Benalla Football Club in the Ovens and Murray Football League prior to playing with Hawthorn.

Notes

External links 

1928 births
1991 deaths
Australian rules footballers from Victoria (Australia)
Hawthorn Football Club players
Benalla Football Club players